The Regional Science High School for Region VI (formerly Aklan Development High School (ADHS) / Science Development High School of Aklan (SDHSA) / Science Development National High School (SDNHS) is a public secondary science school supervised by the Department of Education. It is located in Old Buswang, Kalibo, Aklan, Philippines.

History
Dr. Constancio I. Constantino, then Chairman of the Committee on Education and Culture of the Sangguniang Panlalawigan of the Province of Aklan, in 1979 conceived the idea of establishing a provincial high school for the intellectually gifted and science-mathematics oriented youth of the province. 

Former Governor Roberto Q. Garcia issued an Executive Order creating a steering committee to study and work for the establishment of the school. 

The Sangguniang Panlalawigan, during the 45th regular session approved Resolution No.178, s. 1979 on December 7, 1979 which authorized the establishment of ADHS.

ADHS was modeled after the Manila Science High School which offers Special Science Secondary Education Curriculum with selective admission and retention requirements for students.

The authority to operate the first year class was endorsed by School Division Superintendent Joaquin Tesoro and was approved by Minister Onofre D. Corpus on March 11, 1980. The first year class consisted of 37 scholars who were selected based on a competitive admission test administered by the Science Foundation of the Philippines Center No.6. 

The class was formally opened by the MEC Regional Director Antonio B. Tanchuan on June 9, 1980 for the school year 1980-81 and temporarily housed at the Bagong Lipunan Building of the Kalibo Pilot Elementary School. 

The second, third and fourth years were progressively organized every succeeding year thereafter. The school was transferred to its temporary site at the Provincial Capitol compound in the school year 1981–82.

Science Development High School of Aklan 
In school year 1982–83, a resolution requested a change from the name Aklan Development High School to Science Development High School of Aklan (SDHSA) to make it more suggestive of its Special Science Secondary Education Curriculum. 

Approval of the change of name was signed by MEC Minister Onofre D. Corpus on December 23, 1982.

On June 21, 1991, the Sangguniang Panlalawigan approved a resolution donating a portion of one hectare of the real property acquired by the provincial government from the Development Bank of the Philippines to the SDHSA and authorizing the provincial governor to execute the Deed of Donation. 

The Deed of Donation was entered into by and between the Provincial Government of Aklan and the Department of Education, Culture and Sports-Science Development National High School of Aklan, on July 11, 1991. The newly acquired school site is located in Barangay Old Buswang, Kalibo, Aklan.

The P3.2 Million DECS-SEDP consists of an administration office, four academic classrooms, library, laboratory and home economics room.

The new school site was inaugurated on October 4, 1993. SDHSA was then changed to Science Development National High School (SDNHS) due to the order of the Department of Education, Culture and Sports that all Barangay high schools should be named as national high schools.

A permanent extension classroom and guard house (through the effort of PTCA) were built in 1994–1995. Two more classrooms were constructed in 1995. Because of the growing population of the SDNHS, makeshift classrooms made of nipa and bamboo were built, four in 1994 and two in 1995, through the efforts of parents.

Gradually, classrooms made of light materials were demolished to give way to more permanent structures. In 1996, a science laboratory was constructed and each year thereafter, classrooms were built under the DECS Regular School Building Program. In March 1997, four classrooms funded out of the CDF of Senator Edgardo Angara were built.

Regional Science High School of Region VI 
The school was converted into a Regional Science High School in 1999. With this conversion, the school caters to the needs of students who are scientifically and mathematically inclined, not just in the province of Aklan but also throughout Region VI.

It now houses the Provincial Adolescent Health and Youth Development Program Center of Aklan (AHYDP-Teen Center).

Admission

Admission for Junior High School
Students who belong to the upper 10% of the Grade VI graduating class, recommended by their respective principals are qualified to take the entrance exam.

To acquire an entrance examination form, examinees should have:
 A final grade of 85% in English, Science and Mathematics
 A final grade of 83% in all other learning areas, and
 A weighted average of at least 85%.

Students should maintain a grade of 85 for major subjects and 83 in minor subjects. If a student fails to meet this requirement, he or she would be put under probation for the following year. If the student still fails to meet the requirements he or she will be due to disqualification, hence, he or she is to transfer to another school by the end of the school year.

For Senior High School students, failing to meet the required grade results to immediate disqualification.

Transfer
Only students who have maintained the grade requirement set for RSHS shall be allowed to transfer laterally, that is, from one RSHS to another. Transfer from general high school to the RSHS is not allowed in any curriculum year.

Background

Faculty and Administration
Since its establishment, the institution had Dr. Concepcion P. Constantino as its principal until July 2009. The current principal is Merlyn S. Carrillo. Maria Santia A. Arboleda is the incumbent Principal II.

Academics

Curriculum
The school is following the new curriculum by the Department of Education, the Enhanced K-to-12 Curriculum, as of the school year 2012-2013 and Curricula of English, Science and Mathematics is enriched by additional subjects and electives prescribed in DepEd Order No. 49, s. 2003.

Junior high school
There are a number of 10 classes for each grade level, two (2) of which are elective classes. Minimum of 30 and a maximum of 50 students per class for better instruction and improved laboratory work.

Senior High School
Regional Science High School for Region VI only offers the STEM (Science, Technology, Engineering and Mathematics) and ABM (Accountancy and Business Management) strands of the Academic Track.

Senior High School students are catered in four (4) classes for the STEM strand and a single class for the ABM strand.

Publications
The Scholar's Gazette - official student publication in English
Ang Pahayagang Iskolar - official student publication in Filipino

Sports

2018
RSHS-VI's Boys Basketball Team (Pasarelle) were crowned champions in the annual Fr. Victor Hugo Basketball Cup, an inter-school tournament. Kristian Sucro, the team captain, was hailed as the league's Most Valuable Player.

2020
Alexander Salvador of the RSHS-VI Basketball Boys represented the Unit V in the Aklan provincial athletic meet, winning the championship later on. The 3x3 Basketball girls also won the Provincial trophy, a team composed of Rachelle Serrato, Esther Amador, and Feby Talaguit. They were set to battle for the Western Visayas Regional Athletic Association meet, but the event was cancelled due to the Coronavirus disease 2019 pandemic.

Awards and recognitions 
The school has produced two Metrobank Foundation Inc. awardees in the search for Outstanding Teachers of the Philippines namely, Dioso A. Torre in 1993, and Ruby Agnes B. Estrada in 1999 respectively.

References

External links
Regional Science High School for Western Visayas website
Aklan student writers take part, win awards in PIA writing workshop
Int'l group cites Aklanon volunteer

Regional Science High School Union
Schools in Aklan